The 214th Field Artillery is a regiment in the Georgia National Guard.

History

Lineage
Constituted 29 October 1939 as 214th Coast Artillery (AA)(Coast Artillery Corps) from the following units-
 HHB from ?
 1st Battalion from new
 2nd Battalion from 3rd Battalion, 122nd Infantry
Inducted into federal service 25 November 1940
 3rd battalion activated 27 May 1942 at Benicia, California
Regiment broken up at Guadalcanal, 11 November 1943 as follows-
 HHB as HHB 214th Antiaircraft Artillery Group
 1st Battalion as 528th Antiaircraft Artillery Gun Battalion
 2nd battalion as 950th Antiaircraft Artillery Automatic Weapons Battalion
 3rd Battalion as 250th Antiaircraft Artillery Searchlight Battalion
528th consolidated with 101st AAA Automatic Weapons Battalion 19 July 1946
250th, 950th, and 101st consolidated with 214th Artillery 1 July 1959 a parent regiment under the Combat Arms Regimental System to consist of the 1st, 2nd, and 4th Gun Battalions, the 3rd Automatic Weapons Battalion, and the 5th Detachment.
 reorganized on 1 May 1962 to consist of the 1st Howitzer Battalion, the 3rd Automatic Weapons Battalion, and the 5th Detachment.
 reorganized 16 April 1963 to consist of the 1st Battalion, an element of the 48th Armored Division
 reorganized 1 January 1968 to consist of the 1st and 2nd Battalions.
 redesignated on 1 May 1972 as the 214th Field Artillery.
 withdrawn on 1 June 1989 from the Combat Arms Regimental System and reorganized under the United States Army Regimental System.

Distinctive unit insignia
 Description
A Gold color metal and enamel device  in height overall consisting of a shield blazoned: Gules, a chevronel debased Azure fimbriated Or, below three shell bursts one and two of the third. Attached below and to the sides of the shield is a Gold scroll inscribed “WE HEAR AND STRIKE” in Red letters.
 Symbolism
The shield is scarlet, the color of the Coast Artillery Corps. The chevronel is blue representing the Infantry service of some of the units, indicating strength. The three shell bursts represent the mission of the Anti-Aircraft Artillery.
 Background
The distinctive unit insignia was originally approved for the 214th Coast Artillery (AA) on 2 July 1940. It was redesignated for the 950th Antiaircraft Artillery Automatic Weapons Battalion on 7 March 1951. It was redesignated for the 214th Artillery Regiment on 25 April 1961. The insignia was redesignated for the 214th Field Artillery Regiment on 31 July 1972.

Coat of arms

Blazon
 Shield
Gules, a chevronel debased Azure fimbriated Or, below three shell bursts one and two of the third.
 Crest
That for the regiments and separate battalions of the Georgia Army National Guard: On a wreath of the colors Or and Gules, a boar's head erased Gules, in the mouth an oak branch Vert fructed Or.
 Motto "We Hear and Strike"

Symbolism
 Shield
The shield is scarlet, the color of the Coast Artillery Corps. The chevronel is blue representing the Infantry service of some of the units, indicating strength. The three shell bursts represent the mission of the Anti-Aircraft Artillery.
Crest
The crest is that of the Georgia Army National Guard.

Background
The coat of arms was originally approved for the 214th Coast Artillery (AA) on 2 July 1940. It was redesignated for the 950th Antiaircraft Artillery Automatic Weapons Battalion on 7 March 1951. It was redesignated for the 214th Artillery Regiment on 25 April 1961. The insignia was redesignated for the 214th Field Artillery Regiment on 31 July 1972.

See also
 Battle of Guadalcanal order of battle

References
 
 

 Antiaircraft Artillery Battalions of the U.S. Army (Volumes 1,2) 1991 by James A. Sawicki

External links
 http://www.history.army.mil/html/forcestruc/lh.html

214
214
214
Military units and formations established in 1939